Daniel Garza and Santiago González won the first edition of the tournament, defeating Júlio César Campozano and Víctor Estrella 6–4, 5–7, [11–9] in the final.

Seeds

Draw

Draw

References
 Doubles Draw

Aguascalientes Open - Doubles